Fresno City Council is the legislative body of Fresno, California.

Members
City council is made up of seven members, elected by district:
District 1 (west-central) – Annalisa Perea (Council Vice President)
District 2 (northwest) – Mike Karbassi 
District 3 (southwest and downtown) – Miguel Angel Arias
District 4 (east-central) – Tyler Maxwell (Council President)
District 5 (southeast) – Luis Chavez
District 6 (northeast) – Garry Bredefeld
District 7 (central) – Nelson Esparza 
The council meets in Fresno City Hall.

References

Government of Fresno, California
California city councils